Maurice Willems (born 24 September 1929) is a retired Belgian football player who finished top scorer of the Belgian First Division with 35 goals in 1957 while playing for Gent.  He played 3 times with the Belgium national team between 1956 and 1957.  Willems made his international debut on 14 October 1956 in a 2–3 friendly defeat to the Netherlands and he scored.

References

External links
 

1929 births
Living people
Belgian footballers
K.A.A. Gent players
Belgium international footballers
Belgian Pro League players
Association football forwards
K.M.S.K. Deinze managers
Belgian football managers
K.R.C. Gent players